I Fought the Law is the second and final studio album by The Bobby Fuller Four. It was released by Mustang Records in February 1966 in stereo and mono. Its title comes from the title track, "I Fought the Law", which had recently become a hit single for the group, eventually charting at #9 on the Billboard Hot 100.

Background

The album was released as a response to "I Fought the Law"'s impressive chart performance, featuring a re-recorded version of the song on stereo copies of the album (in which Fuller slyly inserts a certain four-letter word in place of the word "fun"). The song was written by Sonny Curtis and had been previously released on The Crickets first album without Buddy Holly, In Style with the Crickets. In addition, the album recycles seven songs from Fuller's previous album KRLA King of the Wheels, including the band's previous hit single, "Let Her Dance" and "I Fought the Law"'s B-side, "Little Annie Lou". Many songs are also reworkings of older songs recorded by Bobby Fuller in his home studio in El Paso, including "I Fought the Law", "Julie" and "Only When I Dream" are new songs.  "She's My Girl" is listed on the front cover but does not appear on this album as it did on the first.

I Fought the Law became the group's only Billboard charted album, peaking at #144 in April 1966.

Track listing

Personnel

The Bobby Fuller Four
 Bobby Fuller – guitar, lead vocals
 DeWayne Quirico – drums
 Jim Reese – guitar, backing vocals
 Randy Fuller – bass guitar, backing vocals

Technical
 Robert Keane – producer

References

1966 albums
Albums produced by Bob Keane
The Bobby Fuller Four albums